Alexander Smith (1684–1766) was a Roman Catholic bishop who served as the Vicar Apostolic of the Lowland District, Scotland.

Life
Born in Fochabers, Moray in 1684, he was ordained a priest on 19 April 1712. He was appointed the Coadjutor Vicar Apostolic of the Lowland District and Titular Bishop of Mosynopolis by the Holy See on 19 September 1735. He was consecrated to the Episcopate in Edinburgh on 2 November 1735. The principal consecrator was Bishop James Gordon, and the principal co-consecrator was Bishop Hugh MacDonald. On the death of James Gordon on 18 February 1746, he automatically succeeded as the Vicar Apostolic of the Lowland District. He died in office on 21 August 1766, aged 73.

References

External links

1684 births
1766 deaths
Apostolic vicars of Scotland
18th-century Roman Catholic bishops in Scotland
People from Moray